Guzel Tagirkyzy Manyurova (born 24 January 1978) is a Tatar freestyle wrestler who competed for Russia and Kazakhstan. She won three medals at the 2004, 2012 and 2016 Olympics.

Manyurova graduated from the Moscow Veterinarian Academy. Until 2009 she trained at Dynamo Moscow and competed for Russia. She later moved to Alma Ata.

References

External links
 

1978 births
Living people
People from Saransk
Russian female sport wrestlers
Wrestlers at the 2004 Summer Olympics
Wrestlers at the 2012 Summer Olympics
Wrestlers at the 2016 Summer Olympics
Olympic wrestlers of Russia
Olympic wrestlers of Kazakhstan
Olympic silver medalists for Kazakhstan
Olympic silver medalists for Russia
Olympic bronze medalists for Kazakhstan
Olympic medalists in wrestling
Russian expatriate sportspeople in Kazakhstan
Kazakhstani people of Tatar descent
Asian Games medalists in wrestling
Wrestlers at the 2010 Asian Games
Wrestlers at the 2014 Asian Games
Medalists at the 2004 Summer Olympics
Medalists at the 2012 Summer Olympics
Medalists at the 2016 Summer Olympics
World Wrestling Championships medalists
Kazakhstani female sport wrestlers
Medalists at the 2010 Asian Games
Medalists at the 2014 Asian Games
Asian Games silver medalists for Kazakhstan
Asian Games bronze medalists for Kazakhstan
Sportspeople from Mordovia